The Stelvio Pass (Giogo dello Stelvio ;) is a mountain pass in northern Italy bordering Switzerland at an elevation of  above sea level.

Location
The pass is located in the Ortler Alps in Italy between Stilfs ("Stelvio" in Italian) in South Tyrol and Bormio in the province of Sondrio. The Umbrail Pass runs northwards from the Stelvio's western ramp, and the "Three Languages Peak" (Dreisprachenspitze) above the pass is so named because this is where the Italian, German, and Romansh language-speaking areas meet.

The road connects the Valtellina with the Vinschgau valley and the town of Meran. Adjacent to the pass road there is a large summer skiing area. Nearby mountains include Thurwieserspitze, Piz Umbrail, Piz Cotschen, and to the east, the mighty Ortler.

History

Since then, the route has changed very little. Its seventy-five  hairpin turns, 48 of them on the northern side numbered with stones, are a challenge to motorists. Stirling Moss went off the road here during a vintage car event in the 1990s, with an onboard video of his incident being shown on satellite TV.

Before the end of World War I, it formed the border between the Austro-Hungarian Empire and the Italian Kingdom. The Swiss had an outpost and a hotel (which was destroyed) on the Dreisprachenspitze (literally, Three-Language-Peak). During World War I, fierce battles were fought in the ice and snow of the area, with gun fire even crossing the Swiss area at times. The three nations made an agreement not to fire over Swiss territory, which jutted out in between Austria (to the north) and Italy (to the south). Instead they could fire down the pass, as Swiss territory was up and around the peak. After 1919, with the expansion of Italy, the pass lost its strategic importance.

The Stelvio Pass remains important for sport when it is open from May through November. Countless cyclists and motorcyclists struggle to get to the highest stretch of road in the Eastern Alps. It is the highest finish of any Grand Tour. The Giro d'Italia often crosses the Stelvio Pass (it was crossed by the Giro for the first time in 1953, when Fausto Coppi beat Hugo Koblet). As the highest peak, it has been named the Cima Coppi in each edition. Every year, the pass is closed to motor vehicles on one day in late August when about 8,000 cyclists ride and around 25 runners run to the top of the Stelvio.

Bormio regularly hosts World Cup ski racing, usually in late December for a men's downhill event; its Pista Stelvio is among the most challenging courses on the circuit.

The Stelvio Pass was also picked by the British automotive show Top Gear as its choice for the "greatest driving road in the world". This conclusion was reached in the first episode of the show's 10th series after the team went in search of a road that would satisfy every "petrolhead's" driving fantasies. Top Gear later decided that the Transfăgărășan Highway in Romania was a superior driving road.

In 2008, Moto Guzzi started selling a Stelvio model, named after the pass. Alfa Romeo debuted its Stelvio crossover SUV at the 2016 Los Angeles Motor Show.

Stelvio National Park 

Stelvio National Park is the largest in the Italian Alps. It was established in 1935, and covers the Ortles-Cevedale massif, as well as some minor chains that flank it. Wildlife in the park include deer, chamois, ibex, and wolves. Hiking in the park is possible with numerous trails and mountain huts and hiking trails.

Stelvio Bike Day

Each year on the last Saturday of August or the first Saturday of September the Stelvio National Park administration organizes the Stelvio Bike Day. On that day the roads from Bormio and Prad to the pass, as well as the road from Santa Maria Val Müstair to the Umbrail Pass are closed to all traffic except for bicycles. On average around 12,000 cyclists participate in the Bike Day, with the majority taking the road from Prad to the pass and the descent over the Umbrail pass to Val Müstair.

Since 2017 there has also been a Stelvio Marathon for runners, from Prad to Glurns, back to Prad and thence through Stilfs (Stelvio village) to the pass. The first was held on June 17, 2017, with over 300 participants. The second was held on June 16, 2018 and the third on August 31, 2019.

Appearances in Giro d'Italia (since 1953)

See also
 List of highest paved roads in Europe
 List of mountain passes
 Transfăgărășan
 Trollstigen

Notes

References

External links

 Stelvio National Park 
 Stelvio Bike Day
 The Great European Rally drives down Stelvio Pass every year with up to 100 cars taking part. 
 Stelvio. Crossroads of Peace
 Profile on climbbybike.com
 Photos Hairpins, Map, and Cycling Elevation Profile
 Michelin map of 23032 Passo dello Stelvio 
 Photo of Stilfser Joch north ramp and Monte Scorluzzo

Mountain passes of the Alps
Mountain passes of South Tyrol
Climbs in cycle racing in Italy
Roads in Italy
Ortler Alps